Kaiparathina fasciata is a species of sea snail, a marine gastropod mollusk in the family Trochidae.

Distribution
This marine species occurs off the Southern Norfolk Ridge, New Caledonia

References

 Marshall B.A. (1993) A review of the genus Kaiparathina Laws, 1941 (Mollusca: Gastropoda: Trochoidea). The Veliger 36: 185-198.

External links
 To World Register of Marine Species

fasciata
Gastropods described in 1993